While the history of the Jews in the current-day Spanish territory stretches back to Biblical times according to Jewish tradition, the settlement of organised Jewish communities in the Iberian Peninsula possibly traces back to the times after the destruction of the Second Temple in 70 CE. The earliest archaeological evidence of Hebrew presence in Iberia consists of a 2nd-century gravestone found in Mérida. From the late-6th century onward, following the Visigothic monarchs' conversion from Arianism to the Nicene Creed, conditions for Jews in Iberia considerably worsened. 

Following the Umayyad conquest of Hispania in the early 8th century, Jews lived under the Dhimmi system and progressively Arabised. Jews of Al-Andalus stood out particularly during the 10th and 11th centuries, in the caliphal and first taifa periods. Scientific and philological study of the Hebrew Bible began, and secular poetry was written in  Hebrew for the first time. Following the Almoravid and Almohad invasions, many Jews fled to northern Africa and the Christian Iberian kingdoms. Targets of antisemitic mob violence, Jews living in the Christian kingdoms faced persecution throughout the 14th century, leading to the 1391 pogroms. As a result of the Alhambra Decree of 1492, the remaining practising Jews in Castile and Aragon were forced to convert to Catholicism (thus becoming 'New Christians' who faced discrimination under the limpieza de sangre system) whereas those who continued to practise Judaism were expelled, creating diaspora communities in Europe, North Africa and Western Asia (Sephardi Jews). Tracing back to a 1924 decree, there have been initiatives to favour the return of Sephardi Jews to Spain by facilitating Spanish citizenship on the basis of demonstrated ancestry.

An estimated 13,000 to 50,000 Jews live in Spain today.

Early history (before 300) 
Some associate the country of Tarshish, as mentioned in the books of Jeremiah, Ezekiel, I Kings, Jonah and Romans, with a locale in southern Spain. In generally describing Tyre's empire from west to east, Tarshish is listed first (Ezekiel 27.12–14), and in Jonah 1.3 it is the place to which Jonah sought to flee from the Lord; evidently it represents the westernmost place to which one could sail.

The link between Jews and Tarshish is clear. One might speculate that commerce conducted by Jewish emissaries, merchants, craftsmen, or other tradesmen among the Semitic Tyrean Phoenicians might have brought them to Tarshish. Although the notion of Tarshish as Spain is merely based on suggestive material, it leaves open the possibility of a very early Jewish presence in the Iberian peninsula.

More substantial evidence of Jews in Spain comes from the Roman era. Although the spread of the Jews into Europe is most commonly associated with the diaspora that ensued from the Roman conquest of Judea, emigration from Eretz Yisrael into the greater Roman Mediterranean area predated the destruction of Jerusalem by the Romans under Titus. In his Facta et dicta memorabilia, Valerius Maximus makes reference to Jews and Chaldaeans being expelled from Rome in 139 BCE for their "corrupting" influences. According to Josephus, King Agrippa I attempted to discourage the Jews of Jerusalem from rebelling against Roman authority by reference to Jews throughout the Roman Empire and elsewhere; Agrippa warned that 

The Spanish rabbi and scholar, Abraham ibn Daud, wrote in anno 1161: “A tradition exists with the [Jewish] community of Granada that they are from the inhabitants of Jerusalem, of the descendants of Judah and Benjamin, rather than from the villages, the towns in the outlying districts [of Palestine].” Elsewhere, he writes about his maternal grandfather's family and how they came to Spain: "When Titus prevailed over Jerusalem, his officer who was appointed over Hispania appeased him, requesting that he send to him captives made-up of the nobles of Jerusalem, and so he sent a few of them to him, and there were amongst them those who made curtains and who were knowledgeable in the work of silk, and [one] whose name was Baruch, and they remained in Mérida." Here, Rabbi Abraham ben David refers to the second influx of Jews into Spain, shortly after the destruction of Israel's Second Temple.

The earliest mention of Spain (Hispania) is, allegedly, found in Obadiah 1:20: 

While the medieval lexicographer, David ben Abraham Al-Fāsī, identifies Ṣarfat with the city of Ṣarfend (Judeo-Arabic:y צרפנדה), the word Sepharad (Heb. ספרד) in the same verse has been translated by the 1st century rabbinic scholar, Jonathan ben Uzziel, as Aspamia. Based on a later teaching in the compendium of Jewish oral laws compiled by Rabbi Judah ha-Nasi in 189 CE, known as the Mishnah, Aspamia is associated with a very faraway place, generally thought of as Hispania, or Spain. In circa 960 CE, Ḥisdai ibn Šaprūṭ, minister of trade in the court of the caliph in Córdoba, wrote to Joseph the king of Khazaria, saying: “The name of our land in which we dwell is called in the sacred tongue, Sepharad, but in the language of the Arabs, the indwellers of the lands, Alandalus [Andalusia], the name of the capital of the kingdom, Córdoba.”

According to Rabbi David Kimchi (1160–1235), in his commentary on Obadiah 1:20, Ṣarfat and Sepharad, both, refer to the Jewish captivity (Heb. galut) expelled during the war with Titus and who went as far as the countries Alemania (Germany), Escalona, France and Spain. The names Ṣarfat and Sepharad are explicitly mentioned by him as being France and Spain, respectively. Some scholars think that, in the case of the place-name, Ṣarfat (lit. Ṣarfend) – which, as noted, was applied to the Jewish diaspora in France, the association with France was made only exegetically because of its similarity in spelling with the name פרנצא (France), by a reversal of its letters.

The Spanish Jew Moses de León (ca. 1250 – 1305), mentioned a tradition concerning the first Jewish exiles, saying that the vast majority of the first exiles driven away from the land of Israel during the Babylonian captivity refused to return, for they had seen that the Second Temple would be destroyed like the first. Yet another teaching, passed down later, by Moshe ben Machir in the 16th century, explicitly stated that Jews had lived in Spain since the destruction of the First Temple:
 
“Now, I have heard that this praise, emet weyaṣiv [which is now used by us in the prayer rite] was sent by the exiles who were driven away from Jerusalem and who were not with Ezra in Babylon, and that Ezra had sent inquiring after them, but they did not wish to go up [there], replying that since they were destined to go off again into exile a second time, and that the Temple would once again be destroyed, why should we then double our anguish? It is best for us that we remain here in our place and to serve God. Now, I have heard that they are the people of Ṭulayṭulah (Toledo) and those who are near to them. However, that they might not be thought of as wicked men and those who are lacking in fidelity, may God forbid, they wrote down for them this magnanimous praise, etc.”
Similarly, Gedaliah ibn Jechia the Spaniard has written:

“In [5],252 anno mundi (= 1492 CE), the king Ferdinand and his wife, Isabella, made war with the Ishmaelites who were in Granada and took it, and while they returned they commanded the Jews in all of his kingdoms that in but a short time they were to take leave from the countries [they had heretofore possessed], they being Castile, Navarre, Catalonia, Aragón, Granada and Sicily. Then the [Jewish] inhabitants of Ṭulayṭulah (Toledo) answered that they were not present [in the land of Judea] at the time when their Christ was put to death. Apparently, it was written upon a large stone in the city's street which some very ancient sovereign inscribed and testified that the Jews of Ṭulayṭulah (Toledo) did not depart from there during the building of the Second Temple, and were not involved in putting to death [the man whom they called] Christ. Yet, no apology was of any avail to them, neither unto the rest of the Jews, till at length six hundred-thousand souls had evacuated from there.”

Don Isaac Abrabanel, a prominent Jewish figure in Spain in the 15th century and one of the king's trusted courtiers who witnessed the expulsion of Jews from Spain in 1492, informs his readers that the first Jews to reach Spain were brought by ship to Spain by a certain Phiros, a confederate of the king of Babylon in laying siege to Jerusalem. This man was a Greek by birth, but had been given a kingdom in Spain. He became related by marriage to a certain Espan, the nephew of King Heracles, who also ruled over a kingdom in Spain. This Heracles later renounced his throne because of his preference for his native country in Greece, leaving his kingdom to his nephew, Espan, from whom the country's name España (Spain) derives. The Jewish exiles transported there by the said Phiros were descended by lineage from Judah, Benjamin, Shimon and Levi, and were, according to Abrabanel, settled in two districts in southern Spain: one, Andalusia, in the city of Lucena – a city so-called by the Jewish exiles that had come there; the second, in the country around Ṭulayṭulah (Toledo). 

Abrabanel says that the name Ṭulayṭulah was given to the city by its first Jewish inhabitants, and surmises that the name may have meant טלטול (= wandering), on account of their wandering from Jerusalem. He says, furthermore, that the original name of the city was Pirisvalle, so named by its early pagan inhabitants. He also wrote that he found written in the ancient annals of Spanish history collected by the kings of Spain that the 50,000 Jewish households then residing in the cities throughout Spain were the descendants of men and women who were sent to Spain by the Roman Emperor and who had formerly been subjected to him, and whom Titus had originally exiled from places in or around Jerusalem. The two Jewish exiles joined together and became one.

Hispania came under Roman control with the fall of Carthage after the Second Punic War (218–202 BCE). Exactly how soon after this time Jews made their way onto the scene is a matter of speculation. It is within the realm of possibility that they went there under the Romans as free men to take advantage of its rich resources and build enterprises there. These early arrivals would have been joined by those who had been enslaved by the Romans under Vespasian and Titus, and dispersed to the extreme west during the period of the Jewish-Roman War, and especially after the defeat of Judea in 70. The Jewish historian, Josephus, confirms that as early as 90 CE there was already a Jewish diaspora in Europe, made-up of the two tribes, Judah and Benjamin. Thus, he writes in his Antiquities:  

One questionable estimate places the number carried off to Spain at 80,000. Subsequent immigrations came into the area along both the northern African and southern European sides of the Mediterranean.

Among the earliest records which may refer specifically to Jews in Spain during the Roman period is Paul's Letter to the Romans. Many have taken Paul's intention to go to Spain to minister the gospel to indicate the presence of Jewish communities there, as well as Herod's banishment to Spain by Caesar in 39 (Flavius Josephus, The Wars of the Jews, 2.9.6). So too, the Mishna implied that there was a Jewish community in Spain, and that there was communication with the Jewish community in Israel.

From a slightly later period, Midrash Rabbah (Leviticus Rabba § 29.2), and Pesikta de-Rav Kahana (Rosh Hashanna), both, make mention of the Jewish diaspora in Spain (Hispania) and their eventual return. Among these early references are several decrees of the Council of Elvira, convened in the early fourth century, which address proper Christian behaviour with regard to the Jews of Spain, notably forbidding marriage between Jews and Christians.

Of material evidence of early Iberian Jewry, representing a particularly early presence is a signet ring found at Cadiz, dating from the 8th–7th century BCE The inscription on the ring, generally accepted as Phoenician, has been interpreted by a few scholars to be "paleo-Hebraic" Among the early Spanish items of more reliably Jewish origins is an amphora which is at least as old as the 1st century. Although this vessel is not from the Spanish mainland (it was recovered from Ibiza, in the Balearic Islands), the imprint upon it of two Hebrew characters attests to Jewish contact, either direct or indirect, with the area at this time. Two trilingual Jewish inscriptions from Tarragona and Tortosa have been variously dated from the 2nd century BCE to the 6th century. (Bowers, p. 396.) There is also the tombstone inscription from Adra (formerly Abdera) of a Jewish girl named Salomonula, which dates to the early 3rd century.

Thus, while there are limited material and literary indications for Jewish contact with Spain from a very early period, more definitive and substantial data begins with the third century. Data from this period suggest a well-established community, whose foundations must have been laid sometime earlier. It is likely that these communities originated several generations earlier in the aftermath of the conquest of Judea, and possible that they originated much earlier. There may have been close contact between the Jewish community of Babylon and Spain, as the Talmud documents that Yitzhak the Exilarch, son of the sister of Rav Beivai travelled from "Cordoba to Hispania".

As citizens of the Roman Empire, the Jews of Spain engaged in a variety of occupations, including agriculture. Until the adoption of Christianity, Jews had close relations with non-Jewish populations, and played an active role in the social and economic life of the province. The edicts of the Synod of Elvira, although early examples of priesthood-inspired anti-Semitism, provide evidence of Jews who were integrated enough into the greater community to cause alarm among some: of the council's 80 canonic decisions, all those that pertained to Jews served to maintain a separation between the two communities. It seems that by this time the presence of Jews was of greater concern to Catholic authorities than the presence of pagans; Canon 16, which prohibited marriage with Jews, was worded more strongly than canon 15, which prohibited marriage with pagans. Canon 78 threatens those who commit adultery with Jews with ostracism. Canon 48 forbade Jews from blessing Christian crops, and Canon 50 forbade sharing meals with Jews; repeating the command to Hebrew the Bible indicated respect to Gentile.

Visigoth rule – Repression and forced conversions (5th century to 711) 
Barbarian invasions brought most of the Iberian Peninsula under Visigothic rule by the early 5th century. Other than in their contempt for Catholics, who reminded them of the Romans, the Visigoths did not generally take much of an interest in the religious creeds within their kingdom. It was only in 506, when Alaric II (484–507) published his Breviarium Alaricianum  in which he adopted the laws of the ousted Romans that a Visigothic king concerned himself with the Jews.

The tides turned even more dramatically following the conversion of the Visigothic royal family under Recared from Arianism to Catholicism in 587. In their desire to consolidate the realm under the new religion, the Visigoths adopted an aggressive policy concerning the Jews. As the king and the church acted in a single interest, the situation for the Jews deteriorated. Recared approved the Third Council of Toledo's move in 589 to forcibly baptize the children of mixed marriages between Jews and Christians. Toledo III also forbade Jews from holding public office, having intercourse with Christian women and performing circumcisions on slaves or Christians. Still, Recared was not entirely successful in his campaigns since not all Visigoth Arians had converted to Catholicism; the unconverted were true allies of the Jews, both of whom were oppressed, and Jews received some protection from Arian bishops and the independent Visigothic nobility.

While the policies of the subsequent Kings Liuva II (601–604), Witteric (603–610), and Gundemar (610–612) are unknown, Sisebut (612–620) embarked on Recared's course with renewed vigour. Soon after upholding the edict of compulsory baptism for children of mixed marriages, Sisebut instituted what was to become a recurring phenomenon in Spanish official policy, the first edicts expelling Jews from Spain. After his 613 decree that Jews must either convert or be expelled, some fled to Gaul or North Africa, while as many as 90,000 converted. Many of the conversos, like those of later periods, maintained their Jewish identities in secret. During the more tolerant reign of Suintila (621–631), most of the conversos returned to Judaism, and a number of the exiles returned to Spain.

In 633, the Fourth Council of Toledo, while taking a stance in opposition to compulsory baptism, convened to address the problem of crypto-Judaism. It was decided that if professed Christian were determined to be a practising Jew, their children were to be taken away to be raised in monasteries or trusted Christian households. The council further directed that all who had reverted to Judaism during the reign of Swintila had to return to Christianity. The trend toward intolerance continued with the ascent of Chintila (636–639). He directed the Sixth Council of Toledo to order that only Catholics could remain in the kingdom, and taking an unusual step further, he excommunicated "in advance" any of his successors who did not act in accordance with his anti-Jewish edicts. Again, many converted, but others chose exile.

However, the "problem" continued. The Eighth Council of Toledo in 653 again tackled the issue of Jews within the realm. Further measures at the time included the forbidding of all Jewish rites (including circumcision and the observation of the Shabbat), and all converted Jews had to promise to put to death, either by burning or by stoning, any of their brethren known to have relapsed to Judaism. The council was aware that prior efforts had been frustrated by lack of compliance among authorities on the local level; therefore, anyone, including nobles and clergy, found to have aided Jews in their practice of Judaism was to be punished by seizure of one quarter of their property and excommunication.

The efforts again proved unsuccessful. The Jewish population remained sufficiently sizable as to prompt Wamba (672–680) to issue limited expulsion orders against them, and the reign of Erwig (680–687) also seemed vexed by the issue. The Twelfth Council of Toledo again called for forced baptism and, for those who disobeyed, seizure of property, corporal punishment, exile, ll and slavery. Jewish children over seven years of age were taken from their parents and similarly dealt with in 694. Erwig also took measures to ensure that Catholic sympathisers would not be inclined to aid Jews in their efforts to subvert the council's rulings. Heavy fines awaited any nobles who acted in favour of the Jews, and members of the clergy who were remiss in enforcement were subject to a number of punishments.

Egica (687–702), recognising the wrongness of forced baptism, relaxed the pressure on the conversos but kept it up on practising Jews. Economic hardships included increased taxes and the forced sale, at a fixed price, of all property ever acquired from Christians. That effectively ended all agricultural activity for the Jews of Spain. Furthermore, Jews were not to engage in commerce with the Christians of the kingdom or to conduct business with Christians overseas. Egica's measures were upheld by the Sixteenth Council of Toledo in 693.

In 694, at the Council of Toledo, Jews were condemned to slavery by the Visigoths because of a plot to revolt against them encouraged by the Eastern Roman Empire and Romans still residing in Spain.

Under the Catholic Visigoths persecutions increased. The degree of complicity that the Jews had in the Islamic invasion in 711 is uncertain, but since they were openly treated as enemies in the country in which they had resided for generations, it would be no surprise for them to have appealed to the Moors to the south, who were quite tolerant in comparison to the Visigoths, for aid. In any case, the Jews in 694 were accused of conspiring with Muslims across the Mediterranean. Jews were declared traitors, including baptised Jews, found their property confiscated and themselves enslaved. The decree exempted only the converts who dwelt in the mountain passes of Septimania, who were necessary for the kingdom's protection.

The Eastern Roman Empire sent its navy on numerous occasions in the late 7th century and the early 8th century to try to instill uprisings in the Jewish and Christian Roman populations in Spain and Gaul against their Visigoth and Frankish rulers that was also aimed at halting the expansion of Muslim Arabs in the Roman world.

The Jews of Spain were utterly embittered and alienated by Catholic rule at the time of the Muslim invasion. The Moors were perceived as a liberating force and welcomed by Jews eager to help them to administer the country. In many conquered towns, the Muslims left the garrison in the hands of the Jews before they proceeded further north, which initiated the Golden Age of Spanish Jews.

Moorish Spain (711 to 1492)

Moorish conquest 
With the victory of Tariq ibn Ziyad in 711, the lives of the Sephardim changed dramatically. For the most part, the invasion of the Moors was welcomed by the Jews of Iberia.

Both Muslim and Catholic sources tell that Jews provided valuable aid to the invaders. Once the city captured, the defence of Córdoba was left in the hands of Jews, and Granada, Málaga, Seville, and Toledo were left to a mixed army of Jews and Moors. The Chronicle of Lucas de Tuy records that when the Catholics left Toledo on Sunday before Easter to go to the Church of Saint Leocadia to listen to the divine sermon, the Jews acted treacherously, informed the Saracens, closed the gates of the city before the Catholics and opened them for the Moors. However, unlike de Tuy's account, Rodrigo Jiménez de Rada's De rebus Hispaniae maintains that Toledo was "almost  completely empty of its inhabitants" not because of Jewish treachery but because "many had fled to Amiara, others to Asturias and some to the mountains" and the city was then fortified by a militia of Arabs and Jews (3.24). Although in the cases of some towns, the behaviour of the Jews may have been conducive to Muslim success, it was of limited impact overall. 

In spite of the restrictions placed upon the Jews as dhimmis, life under Muslim rule was one of great opportunity in comparison to that under prior Catholic Visigoths, as was testified by the influx of Jews from abroad. To Jews throughout the Catholic and Muslim worlds, Iberia was seen as a land of relative tolerance and opportunity. After initial Arab-Berber victories, especially with the establishment of Umayyad dynasty rule by Abd al-Rahman I in 755, the native Jewish community was joined by Jews from the rest of Europe, as well as from Arab territories from Morocco to Mesopotamia (the latter region was known as Babylonia in Jewish sources). Thus, the Sephardim found themselves enriched culturally, intellectually, and religiously by the commingling of diverse Jewish traditions. Contacts with Middle Eastern communities were strengthened, and the influence of the Babylonian academies of Sura and Pumbedita was at its greatest. As a result, until the mid-10th century, much Sephardic scholarship focused on Halakha.

Although not as influential, traditions of the Levant, known as Palestine, were also introduced, in an increased interest in Hebrew and biblical studies.

Arabic culture, of course, also made a lasting impact on Sephardic cultural development. General re-evaluation of scripture was prompted by Muslim anti-Jewish polemics and the spread of rationalism, as well as the anti-Rabbanite polemics of Karaite Judaism.

In adopting Arabic, as had the Babylonian geonim (the heads of the Talmudic Academies in Babylonia), the cultural and intellectual achievements of Arabic culture were opened up to the educated Jew, as was much of the scientific and philosophical speculation of Greek culture, which had been best preserved by Arab scholars. The meticulous regard which the Arabs had for grammar and style also had the effect of stimulating an interest among Jews in philological matters in general. Arabic came to be the main language of Sephardic science, philosophy and everyday business. From the second half of the 9th century, most Jewish prose, including many non-halakhic religious works, was in Arabic. The thorough adoption of Arabic greatly facilitated the assimilation of Jews into Arabic culture.

Although initially, the often-bloody disputes among Muslim factions generally kept Jews out of the political sphere, the first approximately two centuries that preceded the Golden Age were marked by increased activity by Jews in a variety of professions, including medicine, commerce, finance and agriculture.

By the ninth century, some members of the Sephardic community felt confident enough to take part in proselytizing amongst previously-Jewish "Catholics". Most famous were the heated correspondences sent between Bodo the Frank, a former deacon who had converted to Judaism in 838, and the converso Bishop of Córdoba, Álvaro of Córdoba. Both men, by using such epithets as "wretched compiler", tried to convince the other to return to their former religion but to no avail.

Caliphate of Córdoba 
The first period of exceptional prosperity took place under the reign of Abd ar-Rahman III (882–955), the first Caliph of Córdoba (from 929 onward). The inauguration of the Golden Age is closely identified with the career of his Jewish councillor, Hasdai ibn Shaprut (882–942). Originally a court physician, Shaprut's official duties went on to include the supervision of customs and foreign trade. It was in his capacity as dignitary that he corresponded with the Khazars, a kingdom that had converted to Judaism in the 8th century.

Abd al-Rahman III's support for Arabic scholasticism had made Iberia the centre of Arabic philological research. It was within that context of cultural patronage that interest in Hebrew studies developed and flourished. With Hasdai as its leading patron, Córdoba became the "Mecca of Jewish scholars who could be assured of a hospitable welcome from Jewish courtiers and men of means".

In addition to being a poet himself, Hasdai encouraged and supported the work of other Sephardic writers. Subjects covered the spectrum, encompassing religion, nature, music, politics and pleasure. Hasdai brought a number of men of letters to Córdoba, including Dunash ben Labrat, the innovator of Hebrew metrical poetry, and Menahem ben Saruq, the compiler of the first Hebrew dictionary, which came into wide use among the Jews of Germany and France. Celebrated poets of the era include Solomon ibn Gabirol, Yehuda Halevi, Samuel Ha-Nagid ibn Nagrela, and Abraham and Moses ibn Ezra.

For the only time between Biblical times and the origins of the modern state of Israel, a Jew (Samuel ha-Nagid) commanded a Jewish army.

Hasdai benefited world Jewry by creating a favourable environment for scholarly pursuits within Iberia but also by using his influence to intervene on behalf of foreign Jews, as is reflected in his letter to the Byzantine Princess Helena. In it, he requested protection for the Jews under Byzantine rule, attested to the fair treatment of the Christians of al-Andalus and indicated that such was contingent on the treatment of Jews abroad.

The intellectual achievements of the Sephardim of al-Andalus influenced the lives of non-Jews as well. Most notable of the literary contributions is Ibn Gabirol's neo-Platonic Fons Vitae ("The Source of Life"). Thought by many to have been written by a Christian, the work was admired by Christians and studied in monasteries throughout the Middle Ages. Some Arabic philosophers followed Jewish ones in their ideas although that phenomenon was somewhat hindered in that, although in Arabic, Jewish philosophical works were usually written with Hebrew characters. Jews were also active in such fields as astronomy, medicine, logic and mathematics. In addition to training the mind in logical yet abstract and subtle modes of thought, the study of the natural world, as the direct study of the work of the Creator, was ideally a way to better understand and become closer to God. Al-Andalus also became a major centre of Jewish philosophy during Hasdai's time. Following the tradition of the Talmud and the Midrash, many of the most notable Jewish philosophers were dedicated to the field of ethics, although the ethical Jewish rationalism rested on the notion that traditional approaches had not been successful in their treatments of the subject in that they were lacking in rational, scientific arguments.

In addition to contributions of original work, the Sephardim were active as translators. Greek texts were rendered into Arabic, Arabic into Hebrew, Hebrew and Arabic into Latin and all combinations of vice versa occurred. In translating the great works of Arabic, Hebrew, and Greek into Latin, Iberian Jews were instrumental in bringing the fields of science and philosophy, which formed much of the basis of Renaissance learning, into the rest of Europe.

Taifas, Almoravids and Almohads 

In the early 11th century, centralised authority based at Córdoba broke down after the Berber invasion and the ousting of the Umayyads. In its stead arose the independent taifa principalities under the rule of local Arab, Berber, Slavic or Muwallad leaders. Rather than having a stifling effect, the disintegration of the caliphate expanded the opportunities to Jewish and other professionals. The services of Jewish scientists, doctors, traders, poets and scholars were generally valued by the Christian as well as Muslim rulers of regional centres, especially as recently-conquered towns were put back into order.

Among the most prominent Jews to serve as viziers in the Muslim taifas were the ibn Nagrelas (or Naghrela). Samuel Ha-Nagid ibn Nagrela (993–1056) served Granada's King Habbus al-Muzaffar and his son Badis for thirty years. In addition to his roles as policy director and military leader (as one of only two Jews to command Muslim armies, the other being his son Joseph), Samuel ibn Nagrela was an accomplished poet, and his introduction to the Talmud is standard today. His son Joseph ibn Naghrela also acted as vizier but was murdered in the 1066 Granada massacre. There were other Jewish viziers serving in Seville, Lucena, and Saragossa.

The Granada massacre of 1066 was an anti-Jewish pogrom that took place in Granada when a Muslim mob stormed the royal palace, where Joseph had sought refuge, and crucified him. The instigators then attacked 1500 Jewish families and killed approximately 4,000 Granada Jews.

The Golden Age ended before the completion of the Christian Reconquista. The Granada massacre was one of the earliest signs of a decline in the status of Jews, which resulted largely from the penetration and influence of increasingly-zealous Islamic sects from North Africa.

After the fall of Toledo to Christians in 1085, the ruler of Seville sought relief from the Almoravides. The ascetic sect abhorred the liberality of the Islamic culture of al-Andalus, including the position of authority that some dhimmis held over Muslims. In addition to battling the Christians, who were gaining ground, the Almoravides implemented numerous reforms to bring al-Andalus more in line with their notions of proper Islam. In spite of large-scale forcible conversions, Sephardic culture was not entirely decimated. Members of Lucena's Jewish community, for example, managed to bribe their way out of conversion. As the spirit of Andalusian Islam was absorbed by the Almoravides, policies concerning Jews were relaxed. The poet Moses ibn Ezra continued to write during this time, and several Jews served as diplomats and physicians to the Almoravides.

Wars in North Africa with Muslim tribes eventually forced the Almoravides to withdraw their forces from Iberia. As the Christians advanced, Iberian Muslims again appealed to their brethren to the south, this time to those who had displaced the Almoravides in north Africa. The Almohads, who had taken control of much of Islamic Iberia by 1172, far surpassed the Almoravides in fundamentalist outlook and treated the dhimmis harshly. Jews and Christians were expelled from Morocco and Islamic Spain. Faced with the choice of either death or conversion, many Jews emigrated. Some, such as the family of Maimonides, fled south and east to the more tolerant Moslem lands, and others went northward to settle in the growing Christian kingdoms.

Meanwhile, the Reconquista continued in the north. By the early 12th century, conditions for some Jews in the emerging Christian kingdoms were becoming increasingly favourable. As had happened during the reconstruction of towns after the breakdown of authority under the Umayyads, the services of Jews were employed by the Christian leaders, who were increasingly emerging victorious during the later Reconquista. The Jews' knowledge of the language and the culture of the enemy, their skills as diplomats and professionals and their desire for relief from intolerable conditions rendered their services of great value to the Christians during the Reconquista, the very same reasons that they had proved useful to the Arabs in the early stages of the Moslem invasion. The necessity of having conquerors settle in reclaimed territories also outweighed the prejudices of anti-Semitism, at least while the Islamic threat was imminent. Thus, as conditions in Islamic Iberia worsened, immigration to Christian principalities increased.

The Jews from the Muslim south were not entirely secure in their northward migrations, however. Old prejudices were compounded by newer ones. Suspicions of complicity with Islam were alive, and Jews who immigrated from Muslim territories spoke the Muslim language. However, many of the newly-arrived Jews of the north prospered during the late eleventh and early twelfth centuries. The majority of Latin documentation regarding Jews during the period refers to their landed property, fields and vineyards.

In many ways, life had come full circle for the Sephardim of al-Andalus. As conditions became more oppressive in the areas under Muslim rule during the 12th and the 13th centuries, Jews again looked to an outside culture for relief. Christian leaders of reconquered cities granted them extensive autonomy, and Jewish scholarship recovered and developed as communities grew in size and importance (Assis, p. 18). However, the Reconquista Jews never reached the same heights as had those of the Golden Age.

Christian kingdoms (974–1300)

Early rule (974–1085) 
Catholic princes, the counts of Castile and the first kings of León, treated the Jews harshly. In their operations against the Moors they did not spare the Jews, destroying their synagogues and killing their teachers and scholars. Only gradually did the rulers come to realize that, surrounded as they were by powerful enemies, they could not afford to turn the Jews against them. Garcia Fernandez, Count of Castile, in the fuero of Castrojeriz (974), placed the Jews in many respects on an equality with Catholics; and similar measures were adopted by the Council of Leon (1020), presided over by Alfonso V. In Leon many Jews owned real estate, and engaged in agriculture and viticulture as well as in the handicrafts; and here, as in other towns, they lived on friendly terms with the Christian population. The  (1050) therefore found it necessary to revive the old Visigothic law forbidding, under pain of punishment by the Church, Jews and Christians to live together in the same house, or to eat together.

Toleration and Jewish immigration (1085–1212) 
Ferdinand I of Castile set aside a part of the Jewish taxes for the use of the Church, and even the not very religious-minded Alfonso VI gave to the church of León the taxes paid by the Jews of Castro. Alfonso VI, the conqueror of Toledo (1085), was tolerant and benevolent in his attitude toward the Jews, for which he won the praise of Pope Alexander II. To estrange the wealthy and industrious Jews from the Moors he offered the former various privileges. In the fuero of Najara Sepulveda, issued and confirmed by him in 1076, he not only granted the Jews full equality with Catholics, but he even accorded them the rights enjoyed by the nobility. To show their gratitude to the king for the rights granted them, the Jews willingly placed themselves at his and the country's service. Alfonso's army contained 40,000 Jews, who were distinguished from the other combatants by their black-and-yellow turbans; for the sake of this Jewish contingent the Battle of Sagrajas was not begun until after the Sabbath had passed. The king's favoritism toward the Jews, which became so pronounced that Pope Gregory VII warned him not to permit Jews to rule over Catholics, roused the hatred and envy of the latter. After the Battle of Uclés, at which the Infante Sancho, together with 30,000 men were killed, an anti-Jewish riot broke out in Toledo; many Jews were slain, and their houses and synagogues were burned (1108). Alfonso intended to punish the murderers and incendiaries, but died in June, 1109 before he could carry out his intention. After his death the inhabitants of Carrión de los Condes fell upon the Jews; many were slain, others were imprisoned, and their houses were pillaged.

Alfonso VII, who assumed the title of Emperor of Leon, Toledo, and Santiago, curtailed in the beginning of his reign the rights and liberties which his father had granted the Jews. He ordered that neither a Jew nor a convert might exercise legal authority over Catholics, and he held the Jews responsible for the collection of the royal taxes. Soon, however, he became more friendly, confirming the Jews in all their former privileges and even granting them additional ones, by which they were placed on equality with Catholics. Considerable influence with the king was enjoyed by Judah ben Joseph ibn Ezra (Nasi). After the conquest of Calatrava (1147) the king placed Judah in command of the fortress, later making him his court chamberlain. Judah ben Joseph stood in such favor with the king that the latter, at his request, not only admitted into Toledo the Jews who had fled from the persecutions of the Almohades, but even assigned many fugitives dwellings in Flascala (near Toledo), Fromista, Carrion, Palencia, and other places, where new congregations were soon established.

After the brief reign of King Sancho III, a war broke out between Fernando II of León, (who granted the Jews special privileges), and the united kings of Aragon and Navarre. Jews fought in both armies, and after the declaration of peace they were placed in charge of the fortresses. Alfonso VIII of Castile (1166–1214), who had succeeded to the throne, entrusted the Jews with guarding Or, Celorigo, and, later, Mayorga, while Sancho the Wise of Navarre placed them in charge of Estella, Funes, and Murañon. During the reign of Alfonso VIII the Jews gained still greater influence, aided, doubtless, by the king's love of the beautiful Rachel (Fermosa) of Toledo, who was Jewish. When the king was defeated at the Battle of Alarcos by the Almohades under Yusuf Abu Ya'kub al-Mansur, the defeat was attributed to the king's love-affair with Fermosa, and she and her relatives were murdered in Toledo by the nobility. After the victory at Alarcos the emir Muhammad al-Nasir ravaged Castile with a powerful army and threatened to overrun the whole of Catholic Spain. The Archbishop of Toledo called to crusade to aid Alfonso. In this war against the Moors the king was greatly aided by the wealthy Jews of Toledo, especially by his "almoxarife mayor", the learned and generous Nasi Joseph ben Solomon ibn Shoshan (Al-Hajib ibn Amar).

Turning point (1212–1300) 

The Crusaders were hailed with joy in Toledo, but this joy was soon changed to sorrow, as far as the Jews were concerned. The Crusaders began the "holy war" in Toledo (1212) by robbing and killing the Jews, and if the knights had not checked them with armed forces all the Jews in Toledo would have been slain. When, after the battle of Las Navas de Tolosa (1212), Alfonso victoriously entered Toledo, the Jews went to meet him in triumphal procession. Shortly before his death (Oct., 1214) the king issued the fuero de Cuenca, settling the legal position of the Jews in a manner favorable to them.

A turning-point in the history of the Jews of Spain was reached under Ferdinand III, (who permanently united the kingdoms of León and Castile), and under James I, the contemporary ruler of Aragon. The clergy's endeavors against the Jews became more and more pronounced. Spanish Jews of both sexes, like the Jews of France, were compelled to distinguish themselves from Catholics by wearing a yellow badge on their clothing; this order was issued to keep them from associating with Catholics, although the reason given was that it was ordered for their own safety. Some Jews such as Vidal Taroç, were also allowed to own land.

The papal bull issued by Pope Innocent IV in April 1250, to the effect that Jews might not build a new synagogue without special permission, also made it illegal for Jews to proselytize, under pain of death and confiscation of property. They might not associate with the Catholics, live under the same roof with them, eat and drink with them, or use the same bath; neither might a Catholic partake of wine which had been prepared by a Jew. The Jews might not employ Catholic nurses or servants, and Catholics might use only medicinal remedies which had been prepared by competent Catholic apothecaries. Every Jew should wear the badge, though the king reserved to himself the right to exempt anyone from this obligation; any Jew apprehended without the badge was liable to a fine of ten gold maravedís or to the infliction of ten stripes. Jews were also forbidden to appear in public on Good Friday.

The Jewish community in 1300 

The Jews in Spain were citizens of the kingdoms in which they resided (Castile, Aragón, and Valencia were the most important), both as regards their customs and their language. They owned real estate, and they cultivated their land with their own hands; they filled public offices, and on account of their industry they became wealthy while their knowledge and ability won them respect and influence. But this prosperity roused the jealousy of the people and provoked the hatred of the clergy; the Jews had to suffer much through these causes. The kings, especially those of Aragon, regarded the Jews as their property; they spoke of "their" Jews, "their" juderías (Jewish neighborhoods), and in their own interest they protected the Jews against violence, making good use of them in every way possible.  The Jews were vassals of the king, the same as Christian commoners.

There were about 120 Jewish communities in Catholic Spain around 1300, with somewhere around half a million or more Jews, mostly in Castille. Catalonia, Aragón, and Valencia were more sparsely inhabited by Jews.

Even though the Spanish Jews engaged in many branches of human endeavor—agriculture, viticulture, industry, commerce, and the various handicrafts—it was the money business that procured to some of them their wealth and influence. Kings and prelates, noblemen and farmers, all needed money and could obtain it only from the Jews, to whom they paid from 20 to 25 percent interest. This business, which, in a manner, the Jews were forced to pursue in order to pay the many taxes imposed upon them as well as to raise the compulsory loans demanded of them by the kings, led to their being employed in special positions, as "almonries", bailiffs, tax collectors.

The Jews of Spain formed in themselves a separate political body. They lived almost solely in the Juderias, various enactments being issued from time to time preventing them from living elsewhere. From the time of the Moors they had had their own administration. At the head of the aljamas in Castile stood the "rab de la corte", or "rab mayor" (court, or chief, rabbi), also called "juez mayor" (chief justice), who was the principal mediator between the state and the aljamas. These court rabbis were men who had rendered services to the state, as, for example, David ibn Yah.ya and Abraham Benveniste, or who had been royal physicians, as Meïr Alguadez and Jacob ibn Nuñez, or chief-tax-farmers, as the last incumbent of the court rabbi's office, Abraham Senior. They were appointed by the kings, no regard being paid to the rabbinical qualifications or religious inclination of those chosen

1300–1391 

In the beginning of the fourteenth century the position of Jews became precarious throughout Spain as antisemitism increased. Many Jews emigrated from the crowns of Castile and Aragon. It was not until the reigns of Alfonso IV and Peter IV of Aragon, and of the young and active Alfonso XI of Castile (1325), that an improvement set in. In 1328, 5,000 Jews were killed in Navarre following the preaching of a mendicant friar.

Peter of Castile, the son and successor of Alfonso XI, was relatively favorably disposed toward the Jews, who under him reached the zenith of their influence – often exemplified by the success of his treasurer, Samuel ha-Levi. For this reason, the king was called "the heretic" and often "the cruel". Peter, whose education had been neglected, was not quite sixteen years of age when he ascended the throne in 1350. From the commencement of his reign he so surrounded himself with Jews that his enemies in derision spoke of his court as "a Jewish court".

Soon, however a civil war erupted, as Henry II of Castile and his brother, at the head of a mob, invaded on 7 May 1355 that part of the Judería of Toledo called the Alcaná; they plundered the warehouses and murdered about 1200 Jews, without distinction of age or sex. The mob did not, however, succeed in overrunning the Judería of Toledo proper, which was defended by the Jews and by knights loyal to the King. Following the succession of John I of Castile, conditions for Jews seem to have improved somewhat, with John I even making legal exemptions for some Jews, such as Abraham David Taroç.

The more friendly Peter showed himself toward the Jews, and the more he protected them, the more antagonistic became the attitude of his illegitimate half-brother, who, when he invaded Castile in 1360, murdered all the Jews living in Nájera and exposed those of Miranda de Ebro to robbery and death.

Massacres of 1366

Anti-Jewish enactments 
In the Cortes of Soria of 1380, it was enacted that rabbis, or heads of aljamas, should be forbidden, under penalty of a fine of 6,000 maravedís, to inflict upon Jews the penalties of death, mutilation, expulsion, or excommunication; but in civil proceedings they were still permitted to choose their own judges. In consequence of an accusation that the Jewish prayers contained clauses cursing the Catholics, the king ordered that within two months, on pain of a fine of 3,000 maravedís, they should remove from their prayer-books the objectionable passages. Whoever caused the conversion to Judaism of a Moor or of any one confessing another faith, or performed the rite of circumcision upon him, became a slave and the property of the treasury. The Jews no longer dared show themselves in public without the badge, and in consequence of the ever-growing hatred toward them they were no longer sure of life or limb; they were attacked and robbed and murdered in the public streets, and at length the king found it necessary to impose a fine of 6,000 maravedís on any town in which a Jew was found murdered. Against his desire, John was obliged in 1385 to issue an order prohibiting the employment of Jews as financial agents or tax-farmers to the king, queen, infantes, or grandees. To this was added the resolution adopted by the Council of Palencia ordering the complete separation of Jews and Catholics and the prevention of any association between them.

Massacres and mass conversions of 1391 

"The execution of Joseph Pichon and the inflammatory speeches and sermons delivered in Seville by Archdeacon Ferrand Martínez, the pious Queen Leonora's confessor, soon raised the hatred of the populace to the highest pitch. The feeble King John I, in spite of the endeavors of his physician Moses ibn Ẓarẓal to prolong his life, died at Alcalá de Henares on October 9, 1390, and was succeeded by his eleven-year-old son. The council-regent appointed by the king in his testament, consisting of prelates, grandees, and six citizens from Burgos, Toledo, León, Seville, Córdoba, and Murcia, was powerless; every vestige of respect for law and justice had disappeared. Ferrand Martínez, although deprived of his office, continued, in spite of numerous warnings, to incite the public against the Jews, and encourage it to acts of violence. As early as January, 1391, the prominent Jews who were assembled in Madrid received information that riots were threatening in Seville and Córdoba.

A revolt broke out in Seville in 1391. Juan Alfonso de Guzmán, Count of Niebla and governor of the city, and his relative, the "alguazil mayor" Alvar Pérez de Guzmán, had ordered, on Ash Wednesday, March 15, according to the source the arrest and public whipping of two of the mob-leaders. If that date had been Ash Wednesday, Easter would have fallen on 30 April, which is impossible in western Christianity. The fanatical mob, still further exasperated thereby, murdered and robbed several Jews and threatened the Guzmáns with death. In vain did the regency issue prompt orders; Ferrand Martínez continued unhindered his inflammatory appeals to the rabble to kill the Jews or baptize them. On June 6 the mob attacked the Judería of Seville from all sides and killed 4000 Jews; the rest submitted to baptism as the only means of escaping death."

"At this time Seville is said to have contained 7000 Jewish families. Of the three large synagogues existing in the city two were transformed into churches. In all the towns throughout the archbishopric, as in Alcalá de Guadeira, Écija, Cazalla, and in Fregenal de la Sierra, the Jews were robbed and slain. In Córdoba this butchery was repeated in a horrible manner; the entire Judería de Córdoba was burned down; factories and warehouses were destroyed by the flames. Before the authorities could come to the aid of the defenseless people, every one of them—children, young women, old men—had been ruthlessly slain; 2000 corpses lay in heaps in the streets, in the houses, and in the wrecked synagogues."

"The last town visited was Lérida (August 13). The Jews of this city vainly sought protection in the Alcázar; 75 were slain, and the rest were baptized; the latter transformed their synagogue into a church, in which they worshiped as Marranos."

Several responses bearing on the widespread persecution of Iberian Jewry between the years 1390 and 1391 can be found in contemporary Jewish sources, such as in the Responsa of Isaac ben Sheshet (1326–1408), and in the seminal writing of Gedaliah ibn Yahya ben Joseph, Shalshelet haQabbalah (written ca. 1586), as also in Abraham Zacuto’s Sefer Yuḥasin, in Solomon ibn Verga’s Shevaṭ Yehudah, as well as in a Letter written to the Jews of Avignon by Don Hasdai Crescas in the winter of 1391 concerning the events in Spain in the year 1391. The letter is dated 19 October 1391.

According to Don Hasdai Crescas, persecution against Jews began in earnest in Seville in 1391, on the 1st day of the lunar month Tammuz (June). From there the violence spread to Córdoba, and by the 17th day of the same lunar month, it had reached Toledo (then called by Jews after its Arabic name, Ṭulayṭulah). From there, the violence spread to Mallorca and by the 1st day of the lunar month Elul it had also reached the Jews of Barcelona in Catalonia, where the slain were estimated at two-hundred and fifty. So, too, many Jews who resided in the neighboring provinces of Lérida and Gironda and in the kingdom of  València had been affected, as were also the Jews of al-Andalus, whereas many died a martyr's death, while others converted in order to save themselves.

1391–1492 

Many of the Jews from Valencia, Catalonia and Aragon thronged to North Africa, particularly Algiers.

Anti-Jewish laws 
At the Catholic preacher Ferrer's request a law consisting of twenty-four clauses, which had been drawn up by Paul of Burgos, né Solomon haLevi, was issued in January 1412 in the name of the child-king John II of Castile.

The object of this law was to reduce the Jews to poverty and to further humiliate them. They were ordered to live by themselves, in enclosed Juderías, and they were to repair, within eight days after the publication of the order, to the quarters assigned them under penalty of loss of property. They were prohibited from practising medicine, surgery, or chemistry (pharmacy) and from dealing in bread, wine, flour, meat, etc. They might not engage in handicrafts or trades of any kind, nor might they fill public offices, or act as money-brokers or agents. They were not allowed to hire Catholic servants, farmhands, lamplighters, or gravediggers; nor might they eat, drink, or bathe with Catholics, or hold intimate conversation (have sexual relations) with them, or visit them, or give them presents. Catholic women, married or unmarried, were forbidden to enter the Judería either by day or by night. The Jews were allowed no self-jurisdiction whatever, nor might they, without royal permission, levy taxes for communal purposes; they might not assume the title of "Don", carry arms, or trim beard or hair. Jewish women were required to wear plain, long mantles of coarse material reaching to the feet; and it was strictly forbidden for Jews to wear garments made of better material. On pain of loss of property and even of slavery, they were forbidden to leave the country, and any grandee or knight who protected or sheltered a fugitive Jew was punished with a fine of 150,000 maravedís for the first offense. These laws, which were rigidly enforced, any violation of them being punished with a fine of 300–2,000 maravedís and flagellation, were calculated to compel the Jews to embrace Catholicism.

The persecution of the Jews was now pursued systematically. In the hope of mass conversions, Benedict on May 11, 1415, issued a Papal bull consisting of twelve articles, which, in the main, corresponded with the decree ("Pragmática") issued by Catalina, and which had been placed on the statutes of Aragon by Fernando. By this bull Jews and neophytes were forbidden to study the Talmud, to read anti-Catholic writing, in particular the work "Macellum" ("Mar Jesu"), to pronounce the names of Jesus, Maria, or the saints, to manufacture communion-cups or other church vessels or accept such as pledges, or to build new synagogues or ornament old ones. Each community might have only one synagogue. Jews were denied all rights of self-jurisdiction, nor might they proceed against malsines (accusers). They might hold no public offices, nor might they follow any handicrafts, or act as brokers, matrimonial agents, physicians, apothecaries, or druggists. They were forbidden to bake or sell matzot, or to give them away; neither might they dispose of meat which they were prohibited from eating. They might have no intercourse (sex) with Catholics, nor might they disinherit their baptized children. They should wear the badge at all times, and thrice a year all Jews over twelve, of both sexes, were required to listen to a Catholic sermon. (the bull is reprinted, from a manuscript in the archives of the cathedral in Toledo, by Rios ["Hist." ii. 627–653]).

As soon as the Catholic monarchs Ferdinand and Isabella ascended their respective thrones, steps were taken to segregate the Jews both from the conversos and from their fellow countrymen. At the Cortes of Toledo, in 1480, all Jews were ordered to be separated in special barrios, and at the Cortes of Fraga, two years later, the same law was enforced in Navarre, where they were ordered to be confined to the Juderías at night. The same year saw the establishment of the Spanish Inquisition, the main object of which was to deal with the conversos. Though both monarchs were surrounded by Neo-Catholics, such as Pedro de Caballería and Luis de Santángel, and though Ferdinand was the grandson of a Jew, he showed the greatest intolerance to Jews, whether converted or otherwise, commanding all "conversos" to reconcile themselves with the Inquisition by the end of 1484, and obtaining a bull from Pope Innocent VIII ordering all Catholic princes to return all fugitive conversos to the Inquisition of Spain. One of the reasons for the increased rigor of the Catholic monarchs was the disappearance of the fear of any united action by Jews and Moors, the kingdom of Granada being at its last gasp. The rulers did, however, promise the Jews of the Moorish kingdom that they could continue to enjoy their existing rights in exchange for aiding the Spaniards to overthrow the Moors. This promise dated February 11, 1490, was repudiated, however, by the decree of expulsion. See the Catholic Monarchs of Spain.

The prohibitions, persecution and eventual Jewish mass emigration from Spain and Portugal probably had adverse effects on the development of the Spanish economy. Jews and Non-Catholic Christians reportedly had substantially better numerical skills than the Catholic majority, which might be due to the Jewish religious doctrine, which focused strongly on education, for example because Torah-Reading was compulsory. Even when Jews were forced to quit their highly skilled urban occupations, their numeracy advantage persisted. However, during the inquisition, spillover-effects of these skills were rare because of forced separation and Jewish emigration, which was detrimental for economic development.

Architecture 
A small number of pre-expulsion synagogues survive, including the Synagogue of Santa María la Blanca and the Synagogue of El Tránsito in Toledo, the Córdoba Synagogue, the Híjar Synagogue, the Old main synagogue, Segovia and the Synagogue of Tomar.

Edict of Expulsion 

Several months after the fall of Granada, an edict of expulsion called the Alhambra Decree was issued against the Jews of Spain by Ferdinand and Isabella on 31 March 1492. It ordered all Jews of whatever age to leave the kingdom by the last day of July: one day before Tisha B'Av. They were permitted to take their property provided it was not in gold, silver, or money.

The reason given for this action in the preamble of the edict was the relapse of so many conversos owing to the proximity of unconverted Jews, who seduced them from Christianity and kept alive in them the knowledge and practices of Judaism.

It is claimed that Isaac Abarbanel, who had previously ransomed 480 Jews of Málaga from the Catholic Monarchs by a payment of 20,000 doubloons, now offered them 600,000 crowns for the revocation of the edict. It is said also that Ferdinand hesitated, but was prevented from accepting the offer by Tomás de Torquemada, the grand inquisitor, who dashed into the royal presence and, throwing a crucifix down before the king and queen, asked whether, like Judas, they would betray their Lord for money. Torquemada was reputedly of converso ancestry, and the confessor of Isabella, Espina, was previously a Rabin. Whatever the truth of this story, there were no signs of relaxation shown by the court, and the Jews of Spain made preparations for exile. In some cases, as at Vitoria, they took steps to prevent the desecration of the graves of their kindred by presenting the cemetery, called the Judumendi, to the municipality — a precaution not unjustified, as the Jewish cemetery of Seville was later ravaged by the people. The members of the Jewish community of Segovia passed the last three days of their stay in the city in the Jewish cemetery, fasting and wailing over being parted from their dead beloved.

Number of exiles 
The number of Jews exiled from Spain is subject to controversy, with highly exaggerated figures provided by early observers and historians offering figures which numbered the hundreds of thousands. By the time of the expulsion, little more than 100,000 practicing Jews remained in Spain, since the majority had already converted to Catholicism. This in addition to the indeterminate number who managed to return has led recent academic investigations such as those of Joseph Pérez and Julio Valdeón to offer figures of somewhere between 50,000 and 80,000 practicing Jews expelled from Spanish territory.

European context of expulsions 
Jewish expulsion is a well established trend in European history. From the 13th to the 16th century, at least 15 European countries expelled their Jewish populations. The expulsion of the Jews from Spain was preceded by expulsions from England, France and Germany, among many others, and succeeded by at least five more expulsions.

Conversos 

Henceforth the history of the Jews in Spain is that of the conversos, whose numbers, as has been shown, had been increased by no less than 50,000 during the period of the expulsion to a possible total of 300,000. For three centuries after the expulsion, Spanish Conversos were subject to suspicion by the Spanish Inquisition, which executed over 3000 people in the 1570–1700 period on charges of heresy (including Judaism). They were also subject to more general discriminatory laws known as "limpieza de sangre" which required Spaniards to prove their "old Christian" background in order to access certain positions of authority. During this period hundreds of conversos escaped to nearby countries such as England, France and the Netherlands, or converted back to Judaism, thus becoming part of the communities of Western Sephardim or Spanish and Portuguese Jews.

Conversos played an important leadership role in the Revolt of the Comuneros (1520–1522), a popular revolt and civil war in the Crown of Castile against the imperial pretensions of Holy Roman Emperor Charles V.

1858 to the present 
Small numbers of Jews started to arrive in Spain in the 19th century, and synagogues were opened in Madrid.

The Jews of Morocco, where the initial welcome had turned to oppression as centuries passed by, had welcomed the Spanish troops establishing the Spanish protectorate in Morocco as their liberators, General Franco had interviews with some Sefardim, and spoke well of them.

By 1900, not taking Ceuta and Melilla into account, about 1,000 Jews lived in Spain.

Spanish historians started to take an interest in the Sephardim and Judaeo-Spanish, their language. There was a Spanish rediscovery of the Jews of Northern Morocco who still conserved this language and practiced old Spanish customs.

The dictatorship of Miguel Primo de Rivera (1923–1930) decreed the right to Spanish citizenship to a certain number of Sephardim on December 20, 1924. The condition was that they had enjoyed Spanish protection before while living in the Ottoman Empire and that they applied before December 31, 1930. A similar measure was undertaken by the French government regarding non-Muslims in the Levant who had previously been protected by France. The decree especially addressed Jews from Thessaloniki who had refused to take either Greek or Turkish citizenship. The decree was later used by some Spanish diplomats to save Sephardi Jews from persecution and death during the Holocaust.

Prior to the Spanish Civil War and not taking Ceuta and Melilla into account, about 6,000–7,000 Jews lived in Spain, mostly in Barcelona and Madrid.

Spanish Civil War & World War II 

During the Spanish Civil War (1936–1939), synagogues were closed and post-war worship was kept in private homes. Jewish public life resumed in 1947 with the arrival of Jews from Europe and North Africa.

In the first years of World War II, "Laws regulating their admittance were written and mostly ignored." They were mainly from Western Europe, fleeing deportation to concentration camps from occupied France, but also Jews from Eastern Europe, especially Hungary. Trudi Alexy refers to the "absurdity" and "paradox of refugees fleeing the Nazis' Final Solution to seek asylum in a country where no Jews had been allowed to live openly as Jews for over four centuries."

Throughout World War II, Spanish diplomats of the Franco government extended their protection to Eastern European Jews, especially Hungary. Jews claiming Spanish ancestry were provided with Spanish documentation without being required to prove their case and either left for Spain or survived the war with the help of their new legal status in occupied countries.

Once the tide of war began to turn, and Count Francisco Gómez-Jordana Sousa succeeded Franco's brother-in-law Ramón Serrano Suñer as Spain's foreign minister, Spanish diplomacy became "more sympathetic to Jews", although Franco himself "never said anything" about this. Around that same time, a contingent of Spanish doctors travelling in Occupied Poland were fully informed of the Nazi extermination plans by Governor-General Hans Frank, who was under the impression that they would share his views about the matter; when they came home, they passed the story to Admiral Luís Carrero Blanco, who told Franco.

Diplomats discussed the possibility of Spain as a route to a containment camp for Jewish refugees near Casablanca but it came to naught due to lack of Free French and British support. Nonetheless, control of the Spanish border with France relaxed somewhat at this time, and thousands of Jews managed to cross into Spain (many by smugglers' routes). Almost all of them survived the war. The American Jewish Joint Distribution Committee operated openly in Barcelona.

Shortly afterward, Spain began giving citizenship to Sephardi Jews in Greece, Hungary, Bulgaria, and Romania; many Ashkenazi Jews also managed to be included, as did some non-Jews. The Spanish head of mission in Budapest, Ángel Sanz Briz, saved thousands of Ashkenazim in Hungary by granting them Spanish citizenship, placing them in safe houses and teaching them minimal Spanish so they could pretend to be Sephardim, at least to someone who did not know Spanish. The Spanish diplomatic corps was performing a balancing act: Alexy conjectures that the number of Jews they took in was limited by how much German hostility they were willing to engender.

Toward the war's end, Sanz Briz had to flee Budapest, leaving these Jews open to arrest and deportation. An Italian diplomat, Giorgio Perlasca, who was himself living under Spanish protection, used forged documents to persuade the Hungarian authorities that he was the new Spanish Ambassador. As such, he continued Spanish protection of Hungarian Jews until the Red Army arrived.

Although Spain effectively undertook more to help Jews escape deportation to the concentration camps than most neutral countries did, there has been debate about Spain's wartime attitude towards refugees. Franco's regime, despite its aversion to Zionism and "Judeo-Marxist"-Freemasonry conspiracy, does not appear to have shared the rabid anti-Semitic ideology promoted by the Nazis. About 25,000 to 35,000 refugees, mainly Jews, were allowed to transit through Spain to Portugal and beyond.

Some historians argue that these facts demonstrate a humane attitude by Franco's regime, while others point out that the regime only permitted Jewish transit through Spain. After the war, Franco's regime was quite hospitable to those who had been responsible for the deportation of the Jews, notably Louis Darquier de Pellepoix, Commissioner for Jewish Affairs (May 1942 – February 1944) in Vichy France, and to many other former Nazis, such as Otto Skorzeny and Léon Degrelle, and other former Fascists.

José María Finat y Escrivá de Romaní, Franco's chief of security, issued an official order dated May 13, 1941 to all provincial governors requesting a list of all Jews, both local and foreign, present in their districts. After the list of six thousand names was compiled, Romani was appointed Spain's ambassador to Germany, enabling him to deliver it personally to Heinrich Himmler. Following the defeat of Germany in 1945, the Spanish government attempted to destroy all evidence of cooperation with the Nazis, but this official order survived. A Jewish newspaper cited a report published 22 June 2010 in the Spanish daily El País.

At around the same time, synagogues were opened and the communities could hold a discreet degree of activity.

On December 29, 1948, the official state bulletin (BOE) published a list of Sefardím family surnames from Greece and Egypt to which a special protection should be granted.

The Alhambra Decree that had expelled the Jews were formally rescinded on December 16, 1968.

Spain and Israel

The later Israeli ambassador Shlomo Ben-Ami still remembers the Spanish Legion escorting his family out of Tangiers, Morocco, towards Israeli ships anchored in Ceuta. During the Spanish transition to democracy, the recognition of Israel was one of the issues of modernization.

The Union of the Democratic Centre governments were divided. They did not want to risk their Arab friendships and subjected the establishment to the beginning of a durable solution to the Israeli-Arab conflict. After years of negotiations, the Spanish Socialist Workers' Party government of Felipe González established relations with Israel in 1986, denying links between relations and the admission of Spain into the European Economic Community. Spain tries to serve as a bridge between Israel and the Arabs, as seen in the Madrid Conference of 1991.

Between 1948, the year Israel was founded, and 2010, 1,747 Spanish Jews made aliyah to Israel.

 Modern Jewish community 
There are currently around 50,000 Spanish Jews, with the largest communities in Barcelona and Madrid each with around 3,500 members. There are smaller communities in Alicante, Málaga, Tenerife, Granada, Valencia, Benidorm, Cadiz, Murcia and many more.

Barcelona, with a Jewish community of 3,500, has the largest concentration of Jews in Spain. Melilla maintains an old community of Sephardic Jews. The city of Murcia in the southeast of the country has a growing Jewish community and a local synagogue. Kosher olives are produced in this region and exported to Jews around the world. Also there is a new Jewish school in Murcia as a result of the growth in Jewish population immigrating to the Murcia community PolarisWorld.

The modern Jewish community in Spain consists mainly of Sephardim from Northern Africa, especially the former Spanish colonies. In the 1970s, there was also an influx of Argentine Jews, mainly Ashkenazim, escaping from the military junta. With the birth of the European community, Jews from other countries in Europe moved to Spain because of its weather, lifestyle as well as for its cost of living relative to the north of Europe. Some Jews see Spain as an easier life for retirees and for young people. Mazarron has seen its Jewish community grow as well as La Manga, Cartagena and Alicante.

Moreover, Reform and liberal communities have arisen in cities like Barcelona or Oviedo during the last decade.

Some famous Spaniards of Jewish descent are the businesswomen Alicia and Esther Koplowitz, the politician Enrique Múgica Herzog, and Isak Andic, founder of the clothing design and manufacturing company Mango, though only the latter is of Sephardic origin.

There are rare cases of Jewish converts, like the writer Jon Juaristi. Today there is an interest by some Jewish groups working in Spain to encourage the descendants of the Marranos to return to Judaism. This has resulted in a limited number of conversions to the Jewish faith.

Like other religious communities in Spain, the Federation of Jewish Communities in Spain (FCJE) has established agreements with the Spanish government, regulating the status of Jewish clergy, places of worship, teaching, marriages, holidays, tax benefits, and heritage conservation.

In 2014, residents of a village in Spain called Castrillo Matajudios voted to change the name of their town due to risk of confusion resulting from the etymology of the name. "Mata" is a common suffix of placenames in Spain, meaning "forested patch". In this case, it is likely to be a corruption of "mota" meaning "hill". Confusion arises from the word "mata" also meaning "kill", thus rendering a name that could be interpreted as "kill the jews". The name was changed back to its earlier name which would be less subject to surprise by newcomers Castrillo Mota de Judíos (Castrillo Hill of the Jews). Although a mere anecdote in Spain, where it barely made the national press, this story was widely covered in the English speaking press of the United States, United Kingdom and Israel, often misrepresenting the name of the village as "Camp Kill the Jews".

2014–2019 Citizenship law
In 2014 it was announced that the descendants of Sephardic Jews who were expelled from Spain by the Alhambra Decree of 1492 would be offered Spanish citizenship, without being required to move to Spain and/or renounce any other citizenship they may have. The law lapsed on October 1, 2019 and by that point the justice ministry claimed to have received 132,226 applications and approved 1,500 applicants. In order to be approved applicants needed to take "tests in Spanish language and culture... prove their Sephardic heritage, establish or prove a special connection with Spain, and then pay a designated notary to certify their documents." Most applications came from nationals of countries with high levels of insecurity and violence in Latin America (mainly Mexico, Colombia and Venezuela).

 See also  
 
 Foreign relations of Portugal
 Israel–Spain relations
 Golden age of Jewish culture in Spain
 History of the Jews in Portugal
 History of the Jews under Muslim rule
 Jacob ibn Jau
 Jewish community of Calatayud
 Anusim
 Converso
 Crypto-Judaism
 Marrano
 Persecution of Jews
 Samuel Toledano
 Sephardi Jews
 Sephardic law and customs
 Jews of Catalonia
 Portuguese Inquisition
 Spanish and Portuguese Jews
 Spanish Inquisition
 Alhambra Decree
 Pallache family

References

Further reading

 Alexy, Trudi. The Mezuzah in the Madonna's Foot: Oral Histories Exploring Five Hundred Years in the Paradoxical Relationship of Spain and the Jews, New York: Simon & Schuster, 1993.
 
 Ashtor, Eliyahu. The Jews of Moslem Spain, Vol. 2, Philadelphia: The Jewish Publication Society of America, 1979.
 Assis, Yom Tov. The Jews of Spain: From Settlement to Expulsion, Jerusalem: The Hebrew University of Jerusalem, 1988.
 Bartlett, John R. Jews in the Hellenistic World: Josephus, Aristeas, The Sibylline Oracles, Eupolemus, Cambridge: Cambridge University Press, 1985.
 Bowers, W. P. "Jewish Communities in Spain in the Time of Paul the Apostle" Journal of Theological Studies Vol. 26 Part 2, October 1975, pp. 395–402.
 Dan, Joseph. "The Epic of a Millennium: Judeo-Spanish Culture's Confrontation" in Judaism Vol. 41, No. 2, Spring 1992.
 Encyclopaedia Judaica, Jerusalem: Keter Publishing House, Ltd., 1971.
 Gampel, Benjamin R. "Jews, Christians, and Muslims in Medieval Iberia: Convivencia through the Eyes of Sephardic Jews", in Convivencia: Jews, Muslims, and Christians in Medieval Spain, ed. Vivian B. Mann, Thomas F. Glick, and Jerrilynn D. Dodds, New York: George Braziller, Inc., 1992.
 Graetz, Professor H. History of the Jews, Vol. III Philadelphia: The Jewish Publication Society of America, 1894.
 Halkin, Abraham. "The Medieval Jewish Attitude toward Hebrew", in Biblical and Other Studies, ed. Alexander Altman, Cambridge, Massachusetts: Harvard University Press. 1963.
 Katz, Solomon. Monographs of the Mediaeval Academy of America No. 12: The Jews in the Visigothic and Frankish Kingdoms of Spain and Gaul, Cambridge, Massachusetts: The Mediaeval Society of America, 1937.
 Lacy, W. K. and Wilson, B. W. J. G., trans. Res Publica: Roman Politics and Society according to Cicero, Oxford: Oxford University Press, 1970.
 Laeuchli, Samuel Power and Sexuality: The Emergence of Canon Law at the Synod of Elvira, Philadelphia: Temple University Press, 1972.
 Leon, Harry J., The Jews of Ancient Rome Philadelphia: Jewish Publication Society of America, 1960.
 Lewis, Bernard, Cultures in Conflict: Christians, Muslims, and Jews in the Age of Discovery, US: Oxford University Press, 1995.
 Mann, Jacob, Texts and Studies in Jewish History and Literature I Cincinnati: Hebrew Union College Press, 1931.
 Markman, Sidney David, Jewish Remnants in Spain: Wanderings in a Lost World, Mesa, Arizona, Scribe Publishers, 2003.
  Arias, Leopoldo Meruéndano. Los Judíos de Ribadavia y orígen de las cuatro parroquias.
 Raphael, Chaim. The Sephardi Story: A Celebration of Jewish History London: Valentine Mitchell & Co. Ltd., 1991.
 Ray, Jonathan.  The Jew in Medieval Iberia (Boston Academic Studies Press, 2012) 441 pp.
 Sarna, Nahum M., "Hebrew and Bible Studies in Medieval Spain" in Sephardi Heritage, Vol. 1 ed. R. D. Barnett, New York: Ktav Publishing House, Inc., 1971.
 Sassoon, Solomon David, "The Spiritual Heritage of the Sephardim", in The Sephardi Heritage, Vol. 1 ed. R. D. Barnett, New York: Ktav Publishing House Inc., 1971.
 Scherman, Rabbi Nosson and Zlotowitz, Rabbi Meir eds., History of the Jewish People: The Second Temple Era, Brooklyn: Mesorah Publications, Ltd., 1982.
 Stillman, Norman, "Aspects of Jewish Life in Islamic Spain" in Aspects of Jewish Culture in the Middle Ages, ed. Paul E. Szarmach, Albany: State University of New York Press, 1979.
 Whiston, A. M., trans., The Life and Works of Flavius Josephus Philadelphia: The John C. Winston Company, 19??.
 

External links
 Expulsion from Spain and The Anusim, The Jewish History Resource Center, Project of the Dinur Center for Research in Jewish History, The Hebrew University of Jerusalem
 Jewish Spain today
  La Inquisición Española: origen, desarrollo, organización, administración, métodos y proceso inquisitorial
 The Jews in Spain  (from Encyclopaedia Judaica'' 1971)
 Vikipedya, the Judaeo-Spanish Wikipedia
 The Tragic History of the Jews of Spain Rabbi Menachem Levine, Aish.com
 In Plain Language: The song of the Marrano